Opencard was a municipal smart card system in Prague, Czech Republic. Introduced in 2008, the card served as an alternative electronic ticket for all services of the Prague Integrated Transport system and as a payment card for parking fees at most city paid parking zones. It was also replacement of a library card for the Municipal Library and the National Library of Technology and had benefits from various discounts.

Largely outsourced to private contractors, Prague's Opencard has been a major national controversy since its introduction in 2008. Following the flawed tender process, several municipal administrators received suspended sentences and irregularities continue to be scrutinized by the Czech police. Even after the convictions, public-private contracts were renewed.

In early 2016, electronic card "Lítačka" started to be issued as a replacement. Opencard is no longer being issued and its validity definitively ended in February 2020.

References

External links 
  

Fare collection systems in the Czech Republic
Contactless smart cards
Public transport in Prague
Computer-related introductions in 2007